The Millennium Institute (Millennium Intézet) is a Hungarian think tank. 

It is known for its lectures series Várostudás Kollégiuma (College for the Knowledge on the City) on urban planning and development.

References

External links
Millennium Institute
College for the Knowledge on the City

Think tanks based in Hungary
Political and economic think tanks based in the European Union